Cédric Kipré (born 9 December 1996) is a professional footballer who plays as a defender for Cardiff City on loan from EFL Championship club West Bromwich Albion. He has previously played for Leicester City, Corby Town, Motherwell and Wigan Athletic. Born in France, he represents the Ivory Coast internationally.

Club career

Leicester City
After coming through the Youth Academy at Paris Saint-Germain, Kipré joined Leicester City in 2014 and was part of both their Under 18s and Under 21s in his debut season for the club, playing in the then Premier League 2 and FA Youth Cup.

He spent the next few seasons at the King Power Stadium, but only managed games for the Under 21s and the Under 23s. He also formed part of the Under 23s side that played in the EFL Trophy tie against Cheltenham in January 2017.

Corby Town (loan)
In September 2015, Kipré joined National League North side Corby Town on a one-month loan deal.

He made his debut for The Steelmen against Boston United the next night, turning in an excellent performance prompting boss Tommy Wright to say: "Cedric looked the real deal. He was strong, powerful, very good technically on the ball and he was a breath of fresh air.

He returned from his short loan spell having played three first-team games.

Motherwell
After his release from Leicester, Kipré joined Motherwell on trial and played in pre-season games against Stirling Albion and Livingston. He impressed manager Stephen Robinson so much that he was awarded an initial one-year deal on 5 July 2017.

He played his first ever competitive game for the club against Queens Park at Hampden in the League Cup on 15 July, setting up Motherwell's fourth goal in a 5–1 win.

On 28 April 2018, Kipré scored his first Motherwell goal with a glancing header to beat Dundee 2-1.

On 23 August 2017, he extended his contract with Motherwell by a further year, until the summer of 2019. Kipré extended his contract again on 13 April 2018 until the summer of 2020.

Wigan Athletic
Wigan Athletic signed Kipré to a three-year contract on 3 August 2021, having agreed a transfer fee with Motherwell. He made his league debut the following day, playing the full 90 minutes of the 3–2 victory over Sheffield Wednesday. He scored his first goal for Wigan in a 3–1 defeat at Queens Park Rangers on 24 August 2021. On 1 January 2022 Kipré netted from close range to give Wigan Athletic a 3-1 lead against Birmingham City in a match that concluded with a 3-2 win for the "Latics".

West Bromwich Albion
On 4 September 2020, West Bromwich Albion announced the signing of Kipré on a four-year contract.

Loan to Charleroi
On 1 February 2021, Kipré joined Charleroi on a six-month loan.

Cardiff City (loan)
On 15 July 2022, Kipré joined fellow Championship club Cardiff City on a season-long loan deal.

International career
Kipré is eligible to play for the Ivory Coast, with his parents being born there. On 21 March 2018, he was called into the squad for the first time. He made his debut for the under-23s on 27 March 2018, against Togo.

Personal life
Kipré's elder brother, Steve, is also a professional footballer and has played in France, Germany and Scotland, with which he had a short spell with Clyde.

Career statistics

References

External links
 Cédric Kipré profile at Wigan Athletic FC official website

1996 births
Living people
French footballers
Citizens of Ivory Coast through descent
Ivorian footballers
Association football defenders
Leicester City F.C. players
Corby Town F.C. players
Motherwell F.C. players
Wigan Athletic F.C. players
West Bromwich Albion F.C. players
R. Charleroi S.C. players
Cardiff City F.C. players
National League (English football) players
Scottish Professional Football League players
English Football League players
Premier League players
Belgian Pro League players
French expatriate footballers
Ivorian expatriate footballers
Expatriate footballers in England
Expatriate footballers in Scotland
Expatriate footballers in Belgium
French expatriate sportspeople in England
French expatriate sportspeople in Scotland
French expatriate sportspeople in Belgium
Ivorian expatriate sportspeople in England
Ivorian expatriate sportspeople in Scotland
Ivorian expatriate sportspeople in Belgium
French sportspeople of Ivorian descent
Black French sportspeople